Paratritonia is a genus of sea slugs, specifically dendronotid nudibranchs. It is a marine gastropod mollusc in the family Tritoniidae. 

A monotypic genus, the only species is Paratritonia lutea.

Distribution
Paratritonia lutea was found in Japan.

References

Tritoniidae
Monotypic gastropod genera